Knežina may refer to:

Knežina, Sokolac, a village in the municipality of Sokolac, Bosnia and Herzegovina
Knežina, Slovenia
Knežina (Revolutionary Serbia), a territorial division in Revolutionary Serbia